In mathematics, gradient descent (also often called steepest descent) is a first-order iterative optimization algorithm for finding a local minimum of a differentiable function. The idea is to take repeated steps in the opposite direction of the gradient (or approximate gradient) of the function at the current point, because this is the direction of steepest descent. Conversely, stepping in the direction of the gradient will lead to a local maximum of that function; the procedure is then known as gradient ascent.

Gradient descent is generally attributed to Augustin-Louis Cauchy, who first suggested it in 1847. Jacques Hadamard independently proposed a similar method in 1907. Its convergence properties for non-linear optimization problems were first studied by Haskell Curry in 1944, with the method becoming increasingly well-studied and used in the following decades.

Description

It follows that, if

for a small enough step size or learning rate , then  . In other words, the term  is subtracted from  because we want to move against the gradient, toward the local minimum.

We have a monotonic sequence

so, hopefully, the sequence  converges to the desired local minimum. Note that the value of the step size  is allowed to change at every iteration.

 

convergence to a local minimum can be guaranteed. When the function  is convex, all local minima are also global minima, so in this case gradient descent can converge to the global solution.

This process is illustrated in the adjacent picture. Here,  is assumed to be defined on the plane, and that its graph has a bowl shape. A red arrow originating at a point shows the direction of the negative gradient at that point. Note that the (negative) gradient at a point is orthogonal to the contour line going through that point. We see that gradient descent leads us to the bottom of the bowl, that is, to the point where the value of the function  is minimal.

An analogy for understanding gradient descent 

The basic intuition behind gradient descent can be illustrated by a hypothetical scenario. A person is stuck in the mountains and is trying to get down (i.e., trying to find the global minimum). There is heavy fog such that visibility is extremely low. Therefore, the path down the mountain is not visible, so they must use local information to find the minimum. They can use the method of gradient descent, which involves looking at the steepness of the hill at their current position, then proceeding in the direction with the steepest descent (i.e., downhill). If they were trying to find the top of the mountain (i.e., the maximum), then they would proceed in the direction of steepest ascent (i.e., uphill). Using this method, they would eventually find their way down the mountain or possibly get stuck in some hole (i.e., local minimum or saddle point), like a mountain lake. However, assume also that the steepness of the hill is not immediately obvious with simple observation, but rather it requires a sophisticated instrument to measure, which the person happens to have at the moment. It takes quite some time to measure the steepness of the hill with the instrument, thus they should minimize their use of the instrument if they wanted to get down the mountain before sunset. The difficulty then is choosing the frequency at which they should measure the steepness of the hill so not to go off track.

In this analogy, the person represents the algorithm, and the path taken down the mountain represents the sequence of parameter settings that the algorithm will explore. The steepness of the hill represents the slope of the function at that point. The instrument used to measure steepness is differentiation. The direction they choose to travel in aligns with the gradient of the function at that point. The amount of time they travel before taking another measurement is the step size.

Choosing the step size and descent direction 
Philip Wolfe also advocated using "clever choices of the [descent] direction" in practice. Whilst using a direction that deviates from the steepest descent direction may seem counter-intuitive, the idea is that the smaller slope may be compensated for by being sustained over a much longer distance.

To reason about this mathematically, consider a direction  and step size  and consider the more general update:
.
First of all, we would like the update direction to point downhill. Under the fairly weak assumption that  is continuously differentiable, we may prove that:

This inequality implies that the amount by which we can be sure the function  is decreased depends on a trade off between the two terms in square brackets. The first term in square brackets measures the angle between the descent direction and the negative gradient. The second term measures how quickly the gradient changes along the descent direction.

The problem is that evaluating the second term in square brackets requires evaluating , and extra gradient evaluations are generally expensive and undesirable. Some ways around this problem are:

 Forgo the benefits of a clever descent direction by setting , and use line search to find a suitable step-size , such as one that satisfies the Wolfe conditions. A more economic way of choosing learning rates is backtracking line search, a method that has both good theoretical guarantees and experimental results. Note that one does not need to choose   to be the gradient; any direction that has positive intersection product with the gradient will result in a reduction of the function value (for a sufficiently small value of ).
 Under stronger assumptions on the function  such as convexity, more advanced techniques may be possible.

Usually by following one of the recipes above, convergence to a local minimum can be guaranteed. When the function  is convex, all local minima are also global minima, so in this case gradient descent can converge to the global solution.

Solution of a linear system

Gradient descent can be used to solve a system of linear equations

reformulated as a quadratic minimization problem.
If the system matrix  is real symmetric and positive-definite, an objective function is defined as the quadratic function, with minimization of

so that

For a general real matrix , linear least squares define

In traditional linear least squares for real  and  the Euclidean norm is used, in which case

The line search minimization, finding the locally optimal step size  on every iteration, can be performed analytically for quadratic functions, and explicit formulas for the locally optimal  are known.

For example, for real symmetric and positive-definite matrix , a simple algorithm can be as follows,

To avoid multiplying by  twice per iteration,
we note that  implies , which gives the traditional algorithm,

The method is rarely used for solving linear equations, with the conjugate gradient method being one of the most popular alternatives. Both methods can benefit from preconditioning, where gradient descent may require less assumptions on the preconditioner.

Solution of a non-linear system

Gradient descent can also be used to solve a system of nonlinear equations. Below is an example that shows how to use the gradient descent to solve for three unknown variables, x1, x2, and x3. This example shows one iteration of the gradient descent.

Consider the nonlinear system of equations

Let us introduce the associated function

where

One might now define the objective function

which we will attempt to minimize. As an initial guess, let us use

We know that

where the Jacobian matrix  is given by

We calculate:

Thus

and

Now, a suitable  must be found such that

This can be done with any of a variety of line search algorithms. One might also simply guess  which gives

Evaluating the objective function at this value, yields

is a sizable decrease in the objective function. Further steps would reduce its value further until an approximate solution to the system was found.

Comments

Gradient descent works in spaces of any number of dimensions, even in infinite-dimensional ones. In the latter case, the search space is typically a function space, and one calculates the Fréchet derivative of the functional to be minimized to determine the descent direction.

That gradient descent works in any number of dimensions (finite number at least) can be seen as a consequence of the Cauchy-Schwarz inequality. That article proves that the magnitude of the inner (dot) product of two vectors of any dimension is maximized when they are colinear. In the case of gradient descent, that would be when the vector of independent variable adjustments is proportional to the gradient vector of partial derivatives.

The gradient descent can take many iterations to compute a local minimum with a required accuracy, if the curvature in different directions is very different for the given function. For such functions, preconditioning, which changes the geometry of the space to shape the function level sets like concentric circles, cures the slow convergence. Constructing and applying preconditioning can be computationally expensive, however.

The gradient descent can be combined with a line search, finding the locally optimal step size  on every iteration. Performing the line search can be time-consuming. Conversely, using a fixed small  can yield poor convergence.

Methods based on Newton's method and inversion of the Hessian using conjugate gradient techniques can be better alternatives. Generally, such methods converge in fewer iterations, but the cost of each iteration is higher. An example is the BFGS method which consists in calculating on every step a matrix by which the gradient vector is multiplied to go into a "better" direction, combined with a more sophisticated line search algorithm, to find the "best" value of  For extremely large problems, where the computer-memory issues dominate, a limited-memory method such as L-BFGS should be used instead of BFGS or the steepest descent.

Gradient descent can be viewed as applying Euler's method for solving ordinary differential equations  to a gradient flow.  In turn, this equation may be derived as an optimal controller for the control system  with  given in feedback form .

It can be shown that there is a correspondence between neuroevolution and gradient descent.

Modifications
Gradient descent can converge to a local minimum and slow down in a neighborhood of a saddle point. Even for unconstrained quadratic minimization, gradient descent develops a zig-zag pattern of subsequent iterates as iterations progress, resulting in slow convergence. Multiple modifications of gradient descent have been proposed to address these deficiencies.

Fast gradient methods
Yurii Nesterov has proposed a simple modification that enables faster convergence for convex problems and has been since further generalized. For unconstrained smooth problems the method is called the fast gradient method (FGM) or the accelerated gradient method (AGM). It is known that the rate  for the decrease of the cost function is optimal for first-order optimization methods. Nevertheless, there is the opportunity to improve the algorithm by reducing the constant factor. The optimized gradient method (OGM) reduces that constant by a factor of two and is an optimal first-order method for large-scale problems.

For constrained or non-smooth problems, Nesterov's FGM is called the fast proximal gradient method (FPGM), an acceleration of the proximal gradient method.

Momentum or heavy ball method
Trying to break the zig-zag pattern of gradient descent, the momentum or heavy ball method uses a momentum term in analogy to a heavy ball sliding on the surface of values of the function being minimized, or to mass movement in Newtonian dynamics through a viscous medium in a conservative force field. Gradient descent with momentum remembers the solution update at each iteration, and determines the next update as a linear combination of the gradient and the previous update. For unconstrained quadratic minimization, a theoretical convergence rate bound of the heavy ball method is asymptotically the same as that for the optimal conjugate gradient method.

This technique is used in stochastic gradient descent and as an extension to the backpropagation algorithms used to train artificial neural networks. In the direction of updating, stochastic gradient descent adds a stochastic property. The weights can be used to calculate the derivatives.

Extensions
Gradient descent can be extended to handle constraints by including a projection onto the set of constraints. This method is only feasible when the projection is efficiently computable on a computer. Under suitable assumptions, this method converges.  This method is a specific case of the forward-backward algorithm for monotone inclusions (which includes convex programming and variational inequalities).

Gradient descent is a special case of mirror descent using the squared Euclidean distance as the given Bregman divergence.

See also

 Backtracking line search
 Conjugate gradient method
 Stochastic gradient descent
 Rprop
 Delta rule
 Wolfe conditions
 Preconditioning
 Broyden–Fletcher–Goldfarb–Shanno algorithm
 Davidon–Fletcher–Powell formula
 Nelder–Mead method
 Gauss–Newton algorithm
 Hill climbing
 Quantum annealing
 Continuous Local Search

References

Further reading

External links 

 Using gradient descent in C++, Boost, Ublas for linear regression
 Series of Khan Academy videos discusses gradient ascent
 Online book teaching gradient descent in deep neural network context
 Archived at Ghostarchive and the Wayback Machine: 
 Handbook of Convergence Theorems for (Stochastic) Gradient Methods

Mathematical optimization
First order methods
Optimization algorithms and methods
Gradient methods